Piqué, or marcella, refers to a weaving style, normally used with cotton yarn, which is characterized by raised parallel cords or geometric designs in the fabric.  Piqué fabrics vary from semi-sheer dimity to heavy weight waffle cloth.  Twilled cotton and corded cotton are close relatives.

Name 
The name piqué is derived from the French word , meaning 'quilt'; late 18th-century piqué fabrics were considered to imitate a hand-made quilt.

Piqué weave 
The weave is closely associated with white tie, and some accounts even say the fabric was invented specifically for this use. It holds more starch than plain fabric, so produces a stiffer shirt front; piqué shirts would go on to replace earlier plain-weave fronts, which remain a valid alternative. Use of piqué then spread to other parts of formal dress code, and it is now the most common fabric used in the tie and waistcoat of white tie dress.

Piqué weaving 
Piqué weaving was developed by the Lancashire cotton industry in the late 18th century as a mechanised technique of weaving double cloth with an enclosed heavy cording weft. It was originally used to make imitations of the corded Provençal quilts made in Marseille, the manufacture of which became an important industry for Lancashire from the late 18th to the early 20th century. The term "marcella", another name for piqué, is one of a number of variations on the word "Marseille".

Fabrics

Woven piqué
Piqué fabrics are a type of dobby construction. Piqués may be constructed in various patterns such as cord, waffle, honeycomb and birdseye. These fabrics require the addition of extra yarns, called stuffer yarns. These stuffer yarns are incorporated into the back of the fabric to give texture and added depth to the fabric design. Some piqués may be made using the Jacquard attachment on the loom. Although made of 100% cotton today, cotton-silk blends and even pure silk versions were made in the past and in a variety of weaves.

Knitted piqué

Piqué knit is a double knit that forms a structure with pronounced wales. The knit type is possible with warp and weft, both knitting techniques. The texture is used in polo shirts.

Structure 
Knitted piqué has a grained surface on the face and plain single jersey on the other side. The construction is open and prone to shrink more than single jersey. The knit can produce many variants such as single pique, double pique and more; it is also known as Lacoste piqué, for the company's use of the fabric in its signature polo shirts.

References

Woven fabrics